Kyllönen is a Finnish surname. Notable people with the surname include:

Anne Kyllönen (born 1987), Finnish cross-country skier
Arvo Kyllönen (born 1932), Finnish wrestler 
Jens Kyllönen (born 1989), Finnish professional poker player 
Kai Kyllönen (born 1965), Finnish hurdler
Markku Kyllönen (born 1962), Finnish ice hockey player
Merja Kyllönen, Finnish politician
Sanna Kyllönen (born 1971), Finnish sprinter

Finnish-language surnames